The Heart's Invisible Furies is a social novel by Irish novelist John Boyne and published by Doubleday in 2017. The story revolves around the life of Cyril, who struggles with his sexuality, but it takes on board a range of prejudice and intolerance in the Ireland of the past seventy years.

References 

2017 Irish novels
Novels with gay themes
Irish LGBT novels
Novels by John Boyne
Doubleday (publisher) books